Comatose Comes Alive is the second live album by American Christian rock band Skillet, which peaked at No. 164 on the Billboard 200. It is the band's first combination CD/DVD of live recording, as their first official live album was 2000's Ardent Worship, a worship album recorded live. The band's first live DVD was the Alien Youth DVD, which featured an acoustic performance. Comatose Comes Alive was recorded at the Tivoli Theatre on May 9, 2008, in Chattanooga, Tennessee and was released on October 21, 2008. The album is a CD of the concert's audio and a DVD capturing the live show. However, John Cooper's speech after "Savior" is cut from the CD. This is also the first release to feature Jen Ledger on drums.

Track listing

 The Deluxe Edition Bonus Tracks may also be accessed by placing the Comatose Comes Alive enhanced CD disc in a CD-ROM drive and following the prompt to sign-up for the band's email mailing list; a download link for the six bonus tracks will subsequently be emailed to you.

Charts

DVD Content

The DVD contains video of Skillet performing the songs listed above
and several of Skillet's music videos

Music Videos on DVD

Awards 

In 2009, the album was nominated for two Dove Awards: Rock Album of the Year and Long Form Music Video of the Year, at the 40th GMA Dove Awards.

Personnel

John L. Cooper – lead vocals, bass guitar, acoustic guitar, producer
Korey Cooper – rhythm guitar, keyboards, vocals
Ben Kasica – lead guitar
Jen Ledger – drums, vocals on "Yours to Hold"
Caleb Oliver - bass and some vocals on "Those Nights" 
Jonathan Chu – violin
Tate Olsen - Cello
Brian Howes – producer
Skidd Mills – producer
Paul Ebersold – producer
Andy VanDette – mastering

References 

Skillet (band) albums
2008 live albums
2008 video albums
Live video albums
Christian live video albums